Sociedad Cultural Deportivo Recreativa Anaitasuna is a team of handball based in Pamplona, Spain. It plays in Liga ASOBAL.

History

The club handball section was established in 1956. The team has been playing continuously in the first division, the Liga ASOBAL, since 2011. In 2016, he appeared in the final of the Copa del Rey and in 2017 in the final of the Supercopa ASOBAL, but both times they lost to the FC Barcelona team. The team played at the international level in the EHF Cup, was eliminated after the group stage in the 2015/16 and 2017/18 seasons, and reached the quarterfinals in 2016/17.

Crest, colours, supporters

Kit manufacturers

Kits

Team

Current squad 

Squad for the 2022–23 season

Technical staff
 Head coach:  Enrique Domínguez
 Assistant coach:  Pablo Galech
 Fitness coach:  Javier Angulo
 Physiotherapist:  Pablo Inchauspe
 Physiotherapist:  Josetxo Retegi
 Physiotherapist:  Elisa Arretxea
 Club doctor:  Mikel Moreno

Transfers

Transfers for the 2022–23 season

Joining 
  Joao Paulo de Sousa (LB) from  BM Huesca
  Francisco Javier Castro (CB) from  Balonmano Sinfín
  Ernesto Goñi Macua (LB) from  CB Ciudad de Logroño
  Julen Elustondo (CB) from  BM Villa de Aranda

Leaving 
  Juan del Arco (CB) to  CB Cangas
  Ander Izquierdo (CB) to  S.L. Benfica
  Héctor González Díaz (CB) to  Billère Handball
  Adrián Ortiz Echavarri (LW) to  CB Caserío
  Xabier Etxeberria Uriz (RW) (retires)
  Pavel Bulkin (LB)

Previous Squads

Season by season

European record

EHF ranking

Former club members

Notable former players

  Mikel Aguirrezabalaga (2016–2019)
  Antonio Bazán (2013–)
  Alejandro Costoya (2014–2016)
  Juan del Arco (2020-2022)
  Sergey Hernández (2013–2018)
  Ander Izquierdo (2018-2022)
  Niko Mindegía (2007-2008)
  Juan Bar (2021-)
  Nicolás Bonanno (2021-)
  Juan Pablo Fernández (2010–2011)
  Guillermo Fischer (2019-2021)
  Matías Schulz (2008–2009, 2011–2013)
  Damir Djukic (2011)
  Gabriel Ceretta (2016–2019)
  Oswaldo Guimarães (2016–2018)
  Anderson Mollino (2019–2020)
  Raul Nantes (2017–2019)
  Leandro Semedo (2019-2020)
  Rolandas Bernatonis (2011–2014)
  Filipe Mota (2016–2018)
  Ruslan Dashko (2020–2021)
  Gregor Lorger (2014-2017)
  Stanislav Demovič (2007-2009)
  Henrik Nordlander (2016-2018)
  Máximo Cancio (2010–2012)
  Eduardo Salazar (2018-2019)

Former coaches

References

External links
 
 

Spanish handball clubs
Sport in Pamplona
Liga ASOBAL teams
Sports clubs established in 1956
Multi-sport clubs in Spain
Sports teams in Navarre